The vice presidential state car of the Republic of China is the official car used by the Vice President during his/her official duty.

Model
The model of the state car is the Audi A8 L Security Sedan which was delivered in October 2017.

Specifications
The car is equipped with VR9 armor which can protect the occupant from rifle bullets up to 7.61x51 mm and hand grenade. The armor is made of steel, ceramic and aramid fiber. The car is equipped with emergency breathing apparatus and an automatic fire suppression system.

Cost
The car cost about NT$24 million. However, the car was not purchased under the presidential car budget.

See also
 Presidential state car (Republic of China)

References

Road transport of heads of state
Vice presidents of the Republic of China
Vehicles of Taiwan